Sottaiyur is a village located in Punjai Pugalur Municipality in Karur District in the Indian state of Tamil Nadu.

Geography 
It is very close to TNPL Pugalur and falls under its jurisdiction. Nearby villages include Nalliyampalayam, Onavakkalmedu, Sokkankadu, Moolimangalam, Pandipalayam, Masagoundanpudur and Palamapuram.

Communication

BSNL, Aircel, Airtel, Tata Indicom, and Reliance are the communication providers, and landline connections are provided by BSNL. Internet access is not uncommon, with most citizens using dial-up connections.

Transport

Transport facilities are limited, leading most people to commute by bicycles or motorcycles.

The nearby village of Pugalur has a railway station, which is connected to Erode, Coimbatore, Trichy, Chennai and Cochin. Both passenger trains and express trains pass through this station.

Entertainment

Theatres are available in Paramathi, Velur, and Karur, a few kilometers away. Most residents have access to satellite television channels, DVD players, and smartphones.

Industries

The main industry of Sottaiyur is agriculture. Many citizens also work for TNPL paper company, and some are involved in animal husbandry. The agriculture business has improved tremendously, especially after the TEWLIS project, where effluent water is pumped from TNPL to Sottaiyur by pipelines.

Infrastructure 
TNPL gets water from the Thirukkattuthurai village, located at the banks of the Cauvery River. The main crops grown are sugarcane and rice.

Education
The village has no schools. Children attend Moolimangalam Panchayat School, a primary Panchayat school. The schools teach in Tamil. The literacy rate in the village is around 30-40%. Older children attend TNPL Matriculation & Higher secondary school, Pugalur Public School or Pugalur Boys and Girls High School.

The college is affiliated to the Anna University, Chennai and approved by the All India Council of Technical Education, New Delhi.

Facilities

The village has a Pillaiyar temple, a small community hall (Samudhaaya Koodam), one public well, and a water tank and tap for drinking. The village has a kallu kattu, and an open stage with a neem tree in the center, where people chat with their neighbours.

Festivals

The most famous festival is the Bhagavathi Amman festival, which is celebrated during the Tamil month of 'Panguni'. During this festival, the villagers invite all of their relatives to celebrate. The festival lasts for 2 days.

The second most famous festival is the Mariamman Festival. The temple is located in Nanaparappu,  from the village. People celebrate Pongal and Deepavali.

References

External links
TNPL Pugalur Town Panchayat

Villages in Karur district